Chapulco Municipality is a municipality in Puebla in south-eastern Mexico.

References

Municipalities of Puebla